Ne-Yo: The Collection is the first compilation album by American singer-songwriter Ne-Yo. The album was released in Japan on September 2, 2009. The album was also released with a limited edition CD+DVD version complete with the music videos from each of Ne-Yo's singles under the title "Ne-Yo: The Collection - Complete Edition".

Track listing

Charts
Oricon Album Chart at #4, behind local acts such as Crystal Kay, and sold 55,625 copies that week.  The album also debuted at #4 on the Billboard Japan Hot 100 album chart. It sold another 38,943 copies the next week.

Release history

References

External links
 Official Japanese Website

2009 compilation albums
Albums produced by Polow da Don
Albums produced by Stargate
Albums produced by J. R. Rotem
Ne-Yo albums
Universal Music Japan albums